Prakash Sarkar (born 15 February 1997), is an Indian professional footballer who plays as a defender for Real Kashmir in the I-League.

Career
Prakash Sarkar started his career with the youth academy of Pune F.C. under then coach Ranjan Chowdhury and participated in the 2015-16 U-18 I-League and reached the final round. In 2016-17, he joined East Bengal FC and played for the East Bengal F.C. U-18 side, again under Ranjan Chowdhury, which became runners-up in the 2016-17 U-18 I-League.

East Bengal FC

2017-18
In 2017-18, under coach Khalid Jamil, Prakash Sarkar after his excellent performance for the East Bengal F.C. U-18 side,  was promoted to the senior squad and he made his debut in the Calcutta Football League going on to make 5 appearances in total. His I-League debut came in the 2017-18 I-League on 22 December 2017, away against Chennai City F.C. which East Bengal FC won 1-2. He made 9 appearances in the 2017-18 I-League season, playing as a defensive midfield as East Bengal finished 4th. He was also a part of the East Bengal team, that became runners-up in the 2018 Indian Super Cup held at Bhubaneshwar as East Bengal FC lost 1-4 to Bengaluru FC in the final. Prakash Sarkar, however, did not play any of the matches and remained on the bench throughout the campaign.

2018-19
In 2018-19, under coach Alejandro Menendez, Prakash Sarkar did not get as much chance as he got in the previous season with just 3 appearances from the bench in the 2018-19 I-League, the season went very lack-lusture for the defensive midfielder.

2019-20
At the start of 2019-20 season, Prakash Sarkar signed a 3 years contract extension with East Bengal FC. He has played 2 games this season, with 1 appearance in 2019 Durand Cup. Coach Alejandro Menendez has been trying him as a centre-back in the pre-season before the 2019-20 I-League.

Club statistics

Honours

East Bengal
Indian Super Cup runner-up: 2018

Real Kashmir
 IFA Shield: 2021

References

External links

1997 births
Living people
Indian footballers
I-League players
East Bengal Club players
Association football midfielders
Footballers from West Bengal
Real Kashmir FC players